Gokalpura may refer to the following places in India :

 a village in Mahesana Taluka, in Mehsana District, Gujarat
 a village in Vadodara Taluka, in Vadodara district, Gujarat 
 Gokalpura State, a village (perhaps identical to one of the above) and former princely state in Mahi Kantha, Gujarat
 a village in Loharu Tehsil, Haryana